Deep Blue Something is the fourth studio album by alternative rock band Deep Blue Something. It was released on Aezra in 2001.

Details
While this self-titled album is their fourth release, it was the third album released in the US when Byzantium was released outside the US in 1998. Five of the tracks from Byzantium were included in this album with eight new tracks.

Track listing
"Military Man" (Toby Pipes/Clay Bergus) – 5:08
"So Precious" (Deep Blue Something) – 3:04
"She Is" (Deep Blue Something/Matthew Wilder) – 3:26
"Burning a Past" (Deep Blue Something) – 3:23
"Higher" (Todd Pipes/Toby Pipes/Clay Bergus/Jeff Whittington) – 4:35
"Number One" (Toby Pipes) – 3:47
"Hell in Itself" (Todd Pipes) – 4:07
"Who Wants It" (Todd Pipes/Toby Pipes) – 2:25
"Focus" (Toby Pipes) – 4:11
"Parkbench" (Toby Pipes) – 5:00
"Page Me Wolverine" (Todd Pipes) – 3:18
"Enough to Get By" (Todd Pipes/Toby Pipes) – 5:13
"Beautiful Nightmare" (Todd Pipes/Toby Pipes/Greg Wells/Charlotte Caffey) – 4:11

Personnel

Deep Blue Something
 Todd Pipes – bass guitar, lead & backing vocals
 Toby Pipes – acoustic & electric guitars, lead & backing vocals
 Clay Bergus – acoustic & electric guitars, backing vocals
 John Kirtland – drums, percussion

Additional musicians
 Jeff Roe – trombone, horns arrangement
 Randy Burgeson – trumpet
 Dave Monsch – baritone sax
 Peter Hyrka – violin, strings arrangement
 David Angel – violin
 Cate Myer – violin
 Alan Umstead – violin
 Gary Tussing – cello
 Ron de la Vega – cello
 Paulinho Dacosta – percussion
 Jeff Whittington – keyboards

References

2001 albums
Deep Blue Something albums
Albums produced by Charles Fisher (producer)